Jo Clayton (February 15, 1939 – February 13, 1998) was an American fantasy and science fiction author. She wrote 35 novels and many short stories. Her works sold over one and a quarter million copies.

Biography 
She was born Patricia Jo Clayton in Modesto, California, and was raised in the area along with two sisters by her farmsteading parents. Their parents arranged for all three children to attend college, and Jo graduated summa cum laude from the University of Southern California in 1963. She worked as a teacher for thirteen years, beginning in Bell, California.

In 1969 she had a religious conversion and moved to New Orleans to join the Sisters of Mount Carmel, a Roman Catholic order of instructors. She left the order after three years, just before she would have taken her vows to become a nun. While in New Orleans she wrote heavily and also worked as an artist, painting people's pets. By 1983 she decided to move to Portland, Oregon.

At age 57 she was diagnosed with multiple myeloma, a cancer of the bone marrow, and died from her condition a year and a half later. During her stay in the hospital she continued writing, completing a full novel and half of the last book in a trilogy.

She was survived by her mother, Bessie Clayton, and her sisters, Penn Brumm and Pamela Larsen.

Bibliography

References

Sources
 "Additional Statements: Jo Clayton, Author", Senator Tom Harkin, February 27, 1998, Congressional Record, p. S1164.

External links
 Official web site
 
 Goodreads page

1939 births
1998 deaths
20th-century American novelists
20th-century American short story writers
20th-century American women writers
American fantasy writers
American science fiction writers
American women novelists
American women short story writers
Deaths from cancer in Oregon
Deaths from multiple myeloma
Novelists from California
People from Modesto, California
Women science fiction and fantasy writers